Ebenau  is a municipality in the district of Salzburg-Umgebung in the state of Salzburg in Austria.

Tourism
The municipality lies in the Salzkammergut region directly east of the city of Salzburg and is noted for its spectacular scenery, including several canyons. Hiking and canyoning opportunities are plentiful.

References

Cities and towns in Salzburg-Umgebung District